Kitti Gróz (born 5 April 1994 in Budapest) is a retired Hungarian team handball and beach handball player.

Team handball career
Gróz started to play handball at the age of six and her first club was Szentendrei NKE. She rose through the ranks quickly and at the end of the 2009–10 season she finished seventh on the scoring chart in the second division, hitting an impressive 7.74 goals in average (122 goals on 23 matches).

Following her excellent performances many club have been interested to sign the talented left winger. Finally, Váci NKSE, which is also the parent club of Szentendrei NKE, have secured her services.

Beach handball career
Gróz is a gifted beach handball player as well. In 2008, she participated on the first ever Youth European Beach Handball Championship that was held in Nagyatád, and led the Hungarian team to win the title on home soil. She has won the top scorer award and was voted for MVP thus making her prize collection complete.

One year later she played for the adult team, that finished sixth on the 2009 European Beach Handball Championship. Gróz, still only 15, has shown lethal touch once again and topped the scoring charts with 111 points.

In 2011, she was present on the Youth European Beach Handball Championship again, and repeated her former success both on team and personal level: Hungary went undefeated to win the tournament, while Gróz won both the top scorer award and the MVP title. On the following week was held the adult's competition, for that Gróz was selected as well. She was an important piece of the Hungarian team, which finished fifth. Gróz scored 153 points on the tournament, more than any other players, and was awarded the top scorer's prize.

Personal
Her father, János Gróz coached her while at Szentendrei NKE, and he was also the coach of the Hungarian women's beach handball national team.

Achievements
European Beach Handball Championship:
Winner: 2013
Youth European Beach Handball Championship:
Winner: 2008, 2011

Individual awards
 MVP of the European Beach Handball Championship: 2013
 MVP of the Youth European Beach Handball Championship: 2008, 2011
 Youth European Beach Handball Championship Top Scorer: 2008, 2011
 European Beach Handball Championship Top Scorer: 2009, 2011
 Hungarian Beach Handballer of the Year: 2011

References

External links
 Kitti Gróz player profile on Váci NKSE Official Website
 Kitti Gróz career statistics at Worldhandball

1994 births
Living people
Handball players from Budapest
Hungarian female handball players
Hungarian beach handball players
20th-century Hungarian women
21st-century Hungarian women